The Cochran–Rice Farm Complex, which included the Dr. Pierce's Pleasant Pellets Barn, is located in Cottage Grove, Oregon.  The complex was listed on the National Register of Historic Places (NRHP) in 1991. The barn was demolished in 2012 following the expiration of a 20-year easement held by the local historical society.

History
In 1852 John Cochran settled his Donation Land Claim near what is now Cottage Grove, Oregon. Cochran's land included 643 acres, but by 1902 Chochran's son, Robert Cochran, owned 23 acres, and this remaining acreage was deeded to Robert's daughter, Martha Rice.

At the time of NRHP listing in 1991, the property included a bungalow style house built in 1910, a garage built in 1989, a shed built in 1900, and a flattened, prairie style barn constructed in 1900. The farm complex included 2.5 remaining acres. The house, shed, and barn were listed as contributing resources in the historic site designation.

In 1912 the barn was painted with an advertisement for Dr. Pierce's Pleasant Pellets. Ray V. Pierce had sold patent medicines in an era prior to the Pure Food and Drug Act, and he relied upon barns and other easily noticed surfaces for low-cost advertising. In exchange for the advertisement, an owner might be compensated with a free coat of paint on a barn. The barn was repaired and repainted prior to NRHP listing.

Barn demolition 
In 2008, new owner Doug Stout acquired the farm complex through foreclosure. At that time, the size of the property had decreased to 1.7 acres. Stout tried to sell the barn to anyone who would move it off his property. He also tried to sell the barn plus 1.3 acres. His attempts to sell the barn were unsuccessful, and in 2012 he demolished the barn.

The Cochran–Rice Farm Complex remains on the NRHP, although absent its historic barn with the advertisement, "For your liver, Dr. Pierce's Pleasant Pellets."

See also
 National Register of Historic Places listings in Lane County, Oregon

References

External links
Cottage Grove Historical Society

National Register of Historic Places in Lane County, Oregon
Cottage Grove, Oregon
Buildings and structures in Lane County, Oregon
1912 establishments in Oregon
Buildings and structures demolished in 2012
Demolished buildings and structures in Oregon